"Water Baby Blues"/"Water Baby Boogie" is a Western swing instrumental first recorded in 1946 by Merl Lindsay (4 Star 1117) and which became his signature song. Often recorded as "Water Baby Boogie" it became a popular dance tune.

Doyle Salathiel, Lindsay's brother and jazz guitarist who sometime played with the band, wrote a set of novelty lyrics for the tune. Called "Singing Water Baby Blues" (Mercury 70119, 1952) it has such lyrics as:

Other renditions
Other artists with recordings of "Water Baby Blues"/"Water Baby Boogie" include:
 Maddox Brothers and Rose, 4 Star 1507 (1950)
 Joe Maphis, Republic 2006
 Billy Jack Wills, 4 Star X-11
 Leon McAuliffe, Cimarron 4047
 Hank Thompson and the Brazos Valley Boys
 Eddie Cochran on the album Rockin' It Country Style (released 1997, recorded 1953/54)

References

Bibliography
Coffey, Kevin. Merl Lindsay and his Oklahoma Nite Riders (Krazy Kat KKCD 33, 2005) insert.

Western swing songs
Eddie Cochran songs
1946 songs